Chelyoxenus is a genus of clown beetles in the family Histeridae. There are at least three described species in Chelyoxenus.

Species
These three species belong to the genus Chelyoxenus:
 Chelyoxenus insolitus Casey
 Chelyoxenus repens Casey
 Chelyoxenus xerobatis Hubbard, 1894 (gopher tortoise hister beetle)

References

Further reading

 
 

Histeridae
Articles created by Qbugbot